Mary Connery is a former camogie player, winner of the Cuchulainn award presented by Gaelic Weekly magazine in 1965.

Career
She won Ashbourne Cup honours with University College Galway in 1964. In 1966 she captained St Paul’s in their first All Ireland club final.

Coaching & Administration
While still a player, she was elected chair of Kilkenny camogie board in 1966. Although she had retired before Kilkenny won their breakthrough Leinster (1970) and All Ireland (1974) titles, she contributed substantially to the success as coach to the successful Presentation Secondary School, Kilkenny teams in the secondary schools championship of 1969 and 1970, on which Liz Neary, Helena O'Neill, Carmel Doyle and Teresa O'Neill featured. She became chair of Leinster colleges council in 1966.

References

Living people
Kilkenny camogie players
Year of birth missing (living people)